Nachlana railway station is a proposed railway station in Ramban district, Jammu and Kashmir, India. Its code is NCLNA. It will serve Nachlana village. The station proposal includes two platforms. The station lies on Banihal–Katra rail line. The work on this rail line is expected to be finished in the year 2020. The station is surrounded by many of long tunnels of Jammu–Baramulla line.

References

Railway stations in Ramban district
Firozpur railway division
Proposed railway stations in India